Kassim Napa Adam (born 25 May 1976) is a Ugandan boxer. He competed in the men's featherweight event at the 2000 Summer Olympics.

References

External links
 

1976 births
Living people
Ugandan male boxers
Olympic boxers of Uganda
Boxers at the 2000 Summer Olympics
Place of birth missing (living people)
African Games medalists in boxing
Featherweight boxers
African Games silver medalists for Uganda
Competitors at the 1999 All-Africa Games